Frank Möller (born 8 September 1970 in Weimar) is a German judoka. He won a bronze medal in the heavyweight (+100 kg) division at the 1996 Summer Olympics.

Achievements

References

External links
 

1970 births
Living people
Sportspeople from Weimar
People from Bezirk Erfurt
German male judoka
Olympic judoka of Germany
Judoka at the 1996 Summer Olympics
Judoka at the 2000 Summer Olympics
Olympic bronze medalists for Germany
Olympic medalists in judo
Medalists at the 1996 Summer Olympics